Seize the Night (also known as the Three Bats tour) is a 2007 world tour by Meat Loaf to promote the album Bat Out of Hell III: The Monster Is Loose.

Some concerts in April were cancelled due to Meat Loaf's ill health. Just over an hour into a concert in Newcastle upon Tyne on 31 October 2007, he told the audience that it was the last of his life, and walked off stage. He was later diagnosed with an "inter-vocal cord cyst" and cancelled the remaining dates on his European tour. Playing down the comments he made at Newcastle, in a statement he said "I'll be back."

A DVD of the tour was released in October 2007, entitled 3 Bats Live. It also contains a bonus disc featuring the promotional videos and animations from Bat III. The DVD also features Meat Loaf: In Search of Paradise, a documentary about the tour.

Musicians
Many musicians from recent tours returned to play in the Neverland Express band. The most major change was the departure of Patti Russo, who had toured with Meat Loaf for 13 years. Vocalist Aspen Miller and saxophonist/keyboardist Dave Luther joined the band. He opened the show as lead on "All Revved up with No Place to Go".

Paul Crook, Randy Flowers, Mark Alexander, and John Miceli performed on lead guitar, guitar, piano and drums, respectively. Kasim Sulton was bass guitar and musical director.

Marion Raven joined Meat Loaf for the first leg. She was the supporting act, promoting her album Set Me Free. Meat Loaf introduced her on stage at the latter stages of the concerts to duet on "It's All Coming Back to Me Now". Supporting acts for the second leg included backing singer C.C. Colletti and Mother Pearl.

Dates

Set list
 "All Revved Up with No Place to Go" (part)
 "Paradise by the Dashboard Light"
 "You Took the Words Right out of My Mouth"
 "Out of the Frying Pan (And Into the Fire)"
 "Life Is a Lemon and I Want My Money Back"
 "I'd Do Anything for Love (But I Won't Do That)"
 "Objects in the Rear View Mirror May Appear Closer than They Are"
 "Rock and Roll Dreams Come Through"
 "Seize the Night" (part)
 "The Monster Is Loose"
 "Bad for Good"
 "If It Ain't Broke, Break It"
 "Blind as a Bat"
 "Two Out of Three Ain't Bad"
 "Bat Out of Hell"
 "Black Betty"
 "It's All Coming Back to Me Now"
 "Mercury Blues"
 "Gimme Shelter"

Other songs:
 "In the Land of the Pig, The Butcher Is King" (replaced The Monster Is Loose)
 "I'm Gonna Love Her for Both of Us" (played since Dortmund, planned for cancelled shows)

Critical reaction
The staging of "Paradise by the Dashboard Light" received a poor critical reaction due to the 32 years age difference between Meat Loaf and Aspen Miller, the latter dressed in a small costume. After consistent comments in the press, the staging was changed so that the band were dressed in 1970s clothing for the song so that it was divorced from reality. Meat Loaf even wore a wig for some concerts so that he appeared as he did when the first Bat album was released in 1977.

Cancellations
Meat Loaf cancelled some concerts in April due to ill health.

During a performance in Newcastle upon Tyne, UK on October 31, 2007, at the opening of "Paradise by the Dashboard Light" he suggested that the crowd of thousands should enjoy the performance as it was the last of his career. He attempted to sing the first line of the song, but instead said "Ladies and gentlemen, I love you, thank you for coming, but I can no longer continue." Removing the jacket he was wearing, he thanked the audience for 30 years, said "goodbye forever" and left the stage.  The next day his tour promoter, Andrew Miller, refuted that this was the end for Meat Loaf and that he would continue touring after suitable rest.

His management initially claimed that the singer had "acute laryngitis." Nearly a week later he announced that he had been diagnosed with an inter-vocal cyst, and cancelled the remaining dates of his European tour. He announced that he would return, however. He began his Casa de Carne tour in summer 2008 featuring the return of his long-time duet partner Patti Russo. Also, in an attempt to compensate for cutting short the show at Newcastle, he took part in a charity penalty shoot-out at the city's football stadium.

References

First leg dates

Meat Loaf concert tours
2007 concert tours